The '90s: The Last Great Decade is a documentary on the National Geographic Channel (NGC) that examines the 1990s.  It is a three-part documentary that runs for six hours. TV Guide describes it as: "A retrospective of the people and events that marked the 1990s." The Daily News describes it as: "Flashback recalls years both grand and giddy, including cyberbiz, Bill Clinton, Anna Nicole Smith, Roseanne Barr and Vanilla Ice."

It is narrated by Rob Lowe and originally aired July 6–8, 2014 at 9 PM.  After airing on NGC in the US, it then aired on Spanish-language network Nat Geo Mundo in 171 countries. It was produced by Nutopia.  The executive producers are Peter Lovering, Jane Root, Fred Hepburn, Erik Nelson, Michael Cascio; series producer, Glenn Barden.  The National Geographic site describes the series: "The '90s: The Last Great Decade? revisits the decade through 'inside out' storytelling and analysis via 120 original interviews—from unsung heroes behind the decade's most riveting stories to the biggest names in politics, tech, movies and music."

It pulled in 1.10 million viewers on the Sunday night it first aired and was the second highest-rated July telecast in National Geographic Channel's history.

Episode list 

 "Great Expectations"
 "Friends and Enemies"
 "Politically Incorrect"
 "America Goes to War"
 "Reality Bites"
 "Enemy Within"
 "Shock and Awe"
 "Exposed"
 "The Countdown"

References

External links 
 
 
 Time Warner Cable Central review of series.
 Facebook page

See also
 The Nineties equivalent docu-series produced by CNN

National Geographic (American TV channel)
2010s American documentary television series
2014 American television series debuts
2014 American television series endings